The canon of the New Testament is the set of books many modern Christians regard as divinely inspired and constituting the New Testament of the Christian Bible. For historical Christians, canonization was based on whether the material was from authors socially approximate to the apostles and not based solely on divine inspiration – however, many modern scholars recognize that the New Testament texts were not written by apostles. For most, it is an agreed-upon list of 27 books that includes the canonical Gospels, Acts, letters attributed to various apostles, and Revelation, though there are many textual variations. The books of the canon of the New Testament were written before 120 AD. Although the list of what books constituted the canon differed among the hundreds of churches in antiquity, according to ancient church historian Eusebius there was a consensus that the same 27 books constituting the canon today were the same 27 books generally recognized in the first century. For the Orthodox, the recognition of these writings as authoritative was formalized in the Second Council of Trullan of 692. For the Church of England, it was made dogmatic on the Thirty-Nine Articles of 1563; for Calvinism, on the Westminster Confession of Faith of 1647.

From the end of the Apostolic Age, there has been a general consensus among the churches that there were 27 books in the New Testament. This is demonstrated conclusively in several ways. When Church Councils of the fourth century gave their lists of New Testament canons; they affirm that these were the same 27 books that were accepted as canonical from the time of their church fathers at the inception of their church, namely the first century bishops. For example the Council of Carthage in 397 CE stated that the church received from its "fathers" the books which should be received as scripture. Evidence corroborates the claims of the fourth century church councils that their canonical list are the same 27 books that the church received from the earliest bishops. 25 of the 27 New Testament books received as canonical by councils in the 4th century were quoted, referenced and alluded to as authoritative by bishops who were allegedly directly appointed by the apostles in the first century; namely Clement of Rome, Ignatius of Antioch and Polycarp. Irenaeus (died ) quotes and cites 21 books that would end up as part of the New Testament, but does not use Philemon, Hebrews, James, 2 Peter, 3 John and Jude. By the early 3rd century, Origen of Alexandria may have been using the same 27 books as in the modern New Testament, though there were still disputes over the canonicity of Hebrews, James, 2 Peter, 2 and 3 John, and Revelation (see also Antilegomena). Likewise by 200, the Muratorian fragment shows that there existed a set of Christian writings somewhat similar to what is now the New Testament, which included four gospels and argued against objections to them. Thus, while there was plenty of discussion in the Early Church over the New Testament canon, the "major" writings were accepted by almost all Christian authorities by the middle of the second century.

The next two hundred years followed a similar process of continual discussion throughout the entire Church, and localized refinements of acceptance. This process was not yet complete at the time of the First Council of Nicaea in 325, though substantial progress had been made by then. Though a list was clearly necessary to fulfill Constantine's commission in 331 of fifty copies of the Bible for the Church at Constantinople, no concrete evidence exists to indicate that it was considered to be a formal canon. In the absence of a canonical list, the resolution of questions would normally have been directed through the see of Constantinople, in consultation with Bishop Eusebius of Caesarea (who was given the commission), and perhaps other bishops who were available locally.

In his Easter letter of 367, Athanasius, Bishop of Alexandria, gave a list of exactly the same books that would formally become the New Testament canon, and he used the word "canonized" in regard to them. The first council that accepted the present Catholic canon (the Canon of Trent) was the Council of Rome, held by Pope Damasus I (382). A second council was held at the Synod of Hippo (393) reaffirming the previous council list. A brief summary of the acts was read at and accepted by the Council of Carthage (397) and the Council of Carthage (419). These councils took place under the authority of St. Augustine, who regarded the canon as already closed. Pope Damasus I's Council of Rome in 382, if the Decretum Gelasianum is correctly associated with it, issued a biblical canon identical to that mentioned above, or if not the list is at least a 6th-century compilation claiming a 4th-century imprimatur.
Likewise, Damasus's commissioning of the Latin Vulgate edition of the Bible, was instrumental in the fixation of the canon in the West. In 405, Pope Innocent I sent a list of the sacred books to a Gallic bishop, Exsuperius of Toulouse. When these bishops and councils spoke on the matter, however, they were not defining something new, but instead "were ratifying what had already become the mind of the church." Thus, from the 5th century onward, the Western Church was unanimous concerning the New Testament canon.

The last book to be accepted universally was the Book of Revelation, though with time all the Eastern Church also agreed. Thus, by the 5th century, both the Western and Eastern churches had come into agreement on the matter of the New Testament canon. The Council of Trent of 1546 reaffirmed that finalization for Catholicism in the wake of the Protestant Reformation. The Thirty-Nine Articles of 1563 for the Church of England and the Westminster Confession of Faith of 1647 for English presbyterians established the official finalizations for those new branches of Christianity in light of the Reformed faith. The Synod of Jerusalem of 1672 made no changes to the New Testament canon for any Orthodox, but resolved some questions about some of the minor Old Testament books for the Greek Orthodox and most other Orthodox jurisdictions (who chose to accept it).

Early collections
Writings attributed to the apostles circulated among the earliest Christian communities. The Pauline epistles were circulating, perhaps in collected forms, by the end of the 1st century AD. Justin Martyr, in the mid 2nd century, mentions "memoirs of the apostles" as being read on "the day called that of the sun" (Sunday) alongside the "writings of the prophets." A defined set of four gospels (the Tetramorph) was asserted by Irenaeus, c. 180, who refers to it directly.

By the early 3rd century, Origen may have been using the same twenty-seven books as in the present New Testament canon, though there were still disputes over the acceptance of the Letter to the Hebrews, James, II Peter, II John, III John, Jude and Revelation, known as the Antilegomena.  Likewise, the Muratorian fragment is evidence that perhaps as early as 200, there existed a set of Christian writings somewhat similar to the twenty-seven book NT canon, which included four gospels and argued against objections to them.  Thus, while there was a good measure of debate in the Early Church over the New Testament canon, the major writings are claimed to have been accepted by almost all Christians by the middle of the 3rd century.

In his Easter letter of 367, Athanasius, Bishop of Alexandria, gave a list of the books that would become the twenty-seven-book NT canon, and he used the word "canonized" ( kanonizomena) in regard to them. The first council that accepted the present canon of the New Testament may have been the Synod of Hippo Regius in North Africa (393). A brief summary of the acts was read at and accepted by the Councils of Carthage in 397 and 419.  These councils were under the authority of St. Augustine, who regarded the canon as already closed. Pope Damasus I's Council of Rome in 382, if the Decretum Gelasianum is correctly associated with it, issued a biblical canon identical to that mentioned above, or, if not, the list is at least a 6th-century compilation.  Likewise, Damasus' commissioning of the Latin Vulgate edition of the Bible, c. 383, was instrumental in the fixation of the canon in the West.  In c. 405, Pope Innocent I sent a list of the sacred books to a Gallic bishop, Exsuperius of Toulouse. Christian scholars assert that, when these bishops and councils spoke on the matter, however, they were not defining something new but instead "were ratifying what had already become the mind of the Church."

Thus, some claim that, from the 4th century, there existed unanimity in the West concerning the New Testament canon, and that, by the 5th century, the Eastern Church, with a few exceptions, had come to accept the Book of Revelation and thus had come into harmony on the matter of the canon.  Nonetheless, full dogmatic articulations of the canon were not made until the Canon of Trent of 1546 for Roman Catholicism, the Gallic Confession of Faith of 1559 for Calvinism, the Thirty-Nine Articles of 1563 for the Church of England, and the Synod of Jerusalem of 1672 for the Greek Orthodox.

Comparison between earliest biblical canons

Early Christianity (c. 30–325)

Clement of Rome
By the end of the 1st century, some letters of Paul were known to Clement of Rome (fl. 96), together with some form of the "words of Jesus"; but while Clement valued these highly, he did not refer to them as "Scripture" ("graphe"), a term he reserved for the Septuagint.  draws the following conclusion about Clement:

Marcion of Sinope

Marcion of Sinope, a bishop of Asia Minor who went to Rome and was later excommunicated for his views, may have been the first of record to propose a definitive, exclusive, unique list of Christian scriptures, compiled sometime between 130 and 140 AD. Whether his canon was preceded by that of the Church is debated. Though Ignatius did address Christian scripture, before Marcion, against the perceived heresies of the Judaizers and Docetists, he did not define a list of scriptures. In his book Origin of the New Testament Adolf von Harnack argued that Marcion viewed the church at this time as largely an Old Testament church (one that "follows the Testament of the Creator-God") without a firmly established New Testament canon, and that the church gradually formulated its New Testament canon in response to the challenge posed by Marcion.

Marcion rejected the theology of the Old Testament entirely and regarded the God depicted there as an inferior being. In the Antithesis, he claimed the theology of the Old Testament was incompatible with the teaching of Jesus regarding God and morality.

Marcion created a definite group of books that he regarded as fully authoritative, displacing all others. This comprised ten of the Pauline epistles (without the Pastorals) and a gospel similar to that of Luke. It is uncertain whether he edited these books, purging them of what did not accord with his views, or whether his versions represented a separate textual tradition.

Marcion's gospel, called simply the Gospel of the Lord, differed from the Gospel of Luke by lacking any passages that connected Jesus with the Old Testament. He believed that the god of Israel, who gave the Torah to the Israelites, was an entirely different god from the Supreme God who sent Jesus and inspired the New Testament. Marcion termed his collection of Pauline epistles the Apostolikon. These also differed from the versions accepted by later Christian Orthodoxy.

Marcion's list and theology were rejected as heretical by the early church; however, he forced other Christians to consider which texts were canonical and why. He spread his beliefs widely; they became known as Marcionism. In the introduction to his book Early Christian Writings, Henry Wace stated:

 quotes Tertullian's De praescriptione haereticorum 30:

Note 61 of page 308 adds:

Other scholars propose that it was Melito of Sardis who originally coined the phrase Old Testament, which is associated with Supersessionism.

Robert M. Price argues that the evidence that the early church fathers, such as Clement, Ignatius, and Polycarp, knew of the Pauline epistles is unclear, and concludes that Marcion was the first person to collect Paul's writings to various churches and to treat ten Pauline letters, some of them Marcion's own compositions, together with an earlier version of Luke (not the Gospel of Luke as now known):

Justin Martyr
In the mid-2nd century, Justin Martyr (whose writings span the period from c. 145 to 163) mentions the "memoirs of the apostles", which Christians called "gospels" and which were regarded as on par with the Old Testament. Scholars are divided on whether there is any evidence that Justin included the Gospel of John among the "memoirs of the apostles", or whether, on the contrary, he based his doctrine of the Logos on it. Justin quotes the letters of Paul, 1 Peter, and Acts in his writings.

In Justin's works, distinct references are found to Romans, 1 Corinthians, Galatians, Ephesians, Colossians, and 2 Thessalonians, and possible ones to Philippians, Titus, and 1 Timothy. In addition, he refers to an account from an unnamed source of the baptism of Jesus which differs from that provided by the synoptic gospels:

Tatian

Tatian was converted to Christianity by Justin Martyr on a visit to Rome around 150 and returned to Syria in 172 to reform the church there.

Irenaeus

Irenaeus of Lyon referred directly to a defined set of four gospels (the Tetramorph), c. 180. In his central work, Adversus Haereses Irenaeus denounced various early Christian groups that used only one gospel, such as Marcionism which used only Marcion's version of Luke, or the Ebionites which seem to have used an Aramaic version of Matthew, as well as groups that used more than four gospels, such as the Valentinians (A.H. 1.11).

Based on the arguments Irenaeus made in support of only four authentic gospels, some interpreters deduce that the fourfold Gospel must have still been a novelty in Irenaeus's time. Against Heresies 3.11.7 acknowledges that many heterodox Christians use only one gospel while 3.11.9 acknowledges that some use more than four.  The success of Tatian's Diatessaron in about the same time period is "...a powerful indication that the fourfold Gospel contemporaneously sponsored by Irenaeus was not broadly, let alone universally, recognized."

Irenaeus apparently quotes from 21 of the New Testament books and names the author he thought wrote the text. He mentions the four gospels, Acts, the Pauline epistles with the exception of Hebrews and Philemon, as well as the first epistle of Peter, and the first and second epistles of John, and the book of Revelation.  Irenaeus argued that it was illogical to reject Acts of the Apostles but accept the Gospel of Luke, as both were from the same author; in Against Heresies 3.12.12 he ridiculed those who think they are wiser than the Apostles because the Apostles were still under Jewish influence. He may also refer to Hebrews (Book 2, Chapter 30) and James (Book 4, Chapter 16) and maybe even 2 Peter (Book 5, Chapter 28) but does not cite Philemon, 3 John or Jude.

He does think that the letter to the Corinthians, known now as 1 Clement, was of great worth but does not seem to believe that Clement of Rome was the one author (Book 3, Chapter 3, Verse 3) and seems to have the same lower status as Polycarp's Epistle (Book 3, Chapter 3, Verse 3). He does refer to a passage in the Shepherd of Hermas as scripture (Mandate 1 or First Commandment), but this has some consistency problems on his part. Hermas taught that Jesus was not himself a divine being, but a virtuous man who was subsequently filled with the Holy Spirit and adopted as the Son (a doctrine called adoptionism). But Irenaeus's own work, including his citing of the Gospel of John (Jn. 1:1), indicates that he himself believed that Jesus was always God.

Early proto-Orthodox definition attempts

In the late 4th century Epiphanius of Salamis (died 402) Panarion 29 says the Nazarenes had rejected the Pauline epistles and Irenaeus Against Heresies 26.2 says the Ebionites rejected him.

 records a rumor that Paul aimed to subvert the Old Testament (against this rumor see).

 says his letters have been abused by heretics who twist them around "as they do with the other scriptures."

In the 2nd and 3rd centuries Eusebius's Ecclesiastical History 6.38 says the Elchasai "made use of texts from every part of the Old Testament and the Gospels; it rejects the Apostle (Paul) entirely"; 4.29.5 says Tatian the Assyrian rejected Paul's Letters and Acts of the Apostles; 6.25 says Origen accepted 22 canonical books of the Hebrews plus Maccabees plus the four Gospels, one epistle of Peter "perhaps also a second, but this is doubtful," the apocalypse of John, by John an "epistle of very few lines; perhaps also a second and third", and the epistles of Paul who "did not so much as write to all the churches that he taught; and even to those to which he wrote he sent but a few lines." In all, Origen's canon is suggested to be identical to that of Athanasius.

Marcion may have been the first to have a clearly defined list of New Testament books, though this question of who came first is still debated.  The compilation of this list could have been a challenge and incentive to emerging Proto-orthodoxy; if they wished to deny that Marcion's list was the true one, it was incumbent on them to define what the true one was. The expansion phase of the New Testament canon thus could have begun in response to Marcion's proposed limited canon.

Muratorian fragment

The Muratorian fragment is the earliest known example of a defined list of mostly New Testament books.  It survives, damaged and thus incomplete, as a bad Latin translation of an original, no longer extant, Greek text that is usually dated in the late 2nd century, although a few scholars have preferred a 4th-century date.  This is an excerpt from Metzger's translation:

This is evidence that, perhaps as early as 200, there existed a set of Christian writings somewhat similar to what is now the 27-book NT, which included four gospels and argued against objections to them.

Alogi

There were those who rejected the Gospel of John (and possibly also Revelation and the Epistles of John) as either not apostolic or as written by the Gnostic Cerinthus or as not compatible with the Synoptic Gospels. Epiphanius of Salamis called these people the Alogi, because they rejected the Logos doctrine of John and because he claimed they were illogical. There may have also been a dispute over the doctrine of the Paraclete. Gaius or Caius, presbyter of Rome (early 3rd century), was apparently associated with this movement.

Origen

It has recently been suggested that Origen (c. 184 – c. 253) has an identical or nearly identical canon to that of Athanasius in 367. Origen writes in his Homilies on Joshua:

Matthew first sounded the priestly trumpet in his Gospel; Mark also; Luke and John each played their own priestly trumpets. Even Peter cries out with trumpets in two of his epistles; also James and Jude. In addition, John also sounds the trumpet through his epistles, and Luke, as he describes the Acts of the Apostles. And now that last one comes, the one who said, 'I think God displays us apostles last' [1 Cor 4:9], and in fourteen of his epistles, thundering with trumpets, he casts down the walls of Jericho and all the devices of idolatry and dogmas of philosophers, all the way to the foundations.

The list does not specify Revelation, but Origen elsewhere expresses confidence in the canonicity of Revelation. The list also does not specify the number of Johannine epistles as three.

Period of the Seven Ecumenical Councils (325–787)

Eusebius
Eusebius, in his Church History (c. 330), mentioned the books of New Testament according to him:

The Apocalypse of John, also called Revelation, is counted as both accepted (Kirsopp. Lake translation: "Recognized") and disputed, which has caused some confusion over what exactly Eusebius meant by doing so. The disputation perhaps attributed to Origen (see also ).  adds further detail on Paul: "Paul's fourteen epistles are well known and undisputed.  It is not indeed right to overlook the fact that some have rejected the Epistle to the Hebrews, saying that it is disputed by the Church of Rome, on the ground that it was not written by Paul."   mentions the Diatessaron: "But their original founder, Tatian, formed a certain combination and collection of the Gospels, I know not how, to which he gave the title Diatessaron, and which is still in the hands of some.  But they say that he ventured to paraphrase certain words of the apostle [Paul], in order to improve their style."

Codex Claromontanus

The Codex Claromontanus , c. 303–67, a page found inserted into a 6th-century copy of the Epistles of Paul and Hebrews, has the Old Testament, including Tobit, Judith, Wisdom, Sirach, 1–2,4 Maccabees, and the New Testament, plus Acts of Paul, Apocalypse of Peter, Barnabas, and Hermas, but missing Philippians, 1–2 Thessalonians, and Hebrews.

Zahn and Harnack were of the opinion that the list had been drawn up originally in Greek at Alexandria or its neighborhood ~300 AD. According to Jülicher the list belongs to the 4th century and is probably of western origin.

Constantine the Great

In 331, Constantine I commissioned Eusebius to deliver fifty Bibles for the Church of Constantinople. Athanasius (Apol. Const. 4) recorded Alexandrian scribes around 340 preparing Bibles for Constans. Little else is known, though there is plenty of speculation. For example, it is speculated that this may have provided motivation for canon lists, and that Codex Vaticanus and Codex Sinaiticus may be examples of these Bibles. Together with the Peshitta and Codex Alexandrinus, these are the earliest extant Christian Bibles.

Cyril of Jerusalem
, notes the following list of New Testament books from Cyril of Jerusalem (c. 350) from his Catechetical Lectures 4.36:

Council of Laodicea

The Council of Laodicea, c. 363, was one of the first councils that set out to judge which books were to be read aloud in churches. The decrees issued by the thirty or so clerics attending were called canons. Canon 59 decreed that only canonical books should be read, but no list was appended in the Latin and Syriac manuscripts recording the decrees. The list of canonical books, Canon 60, sometimes attributed to the Council of Laodicea is a later addition according to most scholars and has a 22-book OT and 26-book NT (excludes Revelation).

Athanasius
In his Easter letter of 367, Athanasius, Bishop of Alexandria, gave a list of exactly the same books as what would become the 27-book NT canon, and he used the word "canonized" (kanonizomena) in regard to them. This canon was the first time a list agreed with the current canon although the order differed with the letters of Paul being last among the letters unlike the current version.

Cheltenham/Mommsen List
The Cheltenham List, c. 365–90, is a Latin list discovered by the German classical scholar Theodor Mommsen (published 1886) in a 10th-century manuscript (chiefly patristic) belonging to the library of Thomas Phillips at Cheltenham, England. The list probably originated in North Africa soon after the middle of the 4th century.

It has a 24-book Old Testament and 24-book New Testament which provides syllable and line counts but omits Jude and James, and perhaps Hebrews, and seems to question the epistles of John and Peter beyond the first.

Epiphanius
, writes the following list for Epiphanius of Salamis (c. 374–77), from his Panarion 76.5:

Apostolic Canon #85
In c. 380, the redactor of the Apostolic Constitutions attributed a canon to the Twelve Apostles themselves as the 85th of his list of such apostolic decrees:

It is said that the Coptic translation and some Arabic versions include Revelation.

Amphilochius of Iconium
Bishop Amphilochius of Iconium, in his poem Iambics for Seleucus written some time after 394, discusses debate over the inclusion of a number of books that should be received, and seems uncertain about the later Epistles of Peter and John, Jude, and Revelation.

Pope Damasus I
Pope Damasus's commissioning of the Latin Vulgate edition of the Bible to Jerome, c. 383, was instrumental in the fixation of the canon in the West. Pope Damasus I is often considered to be the father of the Catholic canon, since what is thought as his list corresponds to the current Catholic canon. Purporting to date from a "Council of Rome" under Pope Damasus I in 382, the so-called "Damasian list" which some attributed to the Decretum Gelasianum gives a list identical to what would be the Canon of Trent, and, though the text may in fact not be Damasian, it is at least a valuable 6th century compilation.

This list, given below, was purportedly endorsed by Pope Damasus I:

The so-called Decretum Gelasianum de libris recipiendis et non recipiendis, is traditionally attributed to Pope Gelasius I, bishop of Rome 492–496 AD. However, upon the whole, it is probably of South Gallic origin (6th century), but several parts can be traced back to Pope Damasus and reflect Roman tradition.  The 2nd part is a canon catalogue, and the 5th part is a catalogue of apocryphal writings which are to be rejected. The canon catalogue gives all 27 books of the Catholic New Testament.

Jerome
, lists the following New Testament books according to Jerome, (c. 394), from his Epistle 53:

Augustine and the North African councils
Augustine of Hippo declared that one is to "prefer those that are received by all Catholic Churches to those which some of them do not receive. Among those, again, which are not received by all, he will prefer such as have the sanction of the greater number and those of greater authority, to such as are held by the smaller number and those of less authority." (On Christian Doctrines 2.12, chapter 8).

The first council that accepted the present canon of the books of the New Testament may have been the Synod of Hippo in North Africa (393). A brief summary of the acts was read at and accepted by the Synod of Carthage (397) and Council of Carthage (419).  These councils were convened under the authority of St. Augustine, who regarded the canon as already closed. This North African canon was reaffirmed at the Council of Trent of 1546.

Pope Innocent I
In c. 405, Pope Innocent I sent a list of the sacred books to a Gallic bishop, Exsuperius of Toulouse, identical with that of Trent. It states "fourteen" Epistles of Paul, but F.F. Bruce prefers "thirteen" excluding the Hebrews. According to the Catholic Encyclopedia, by the turn of the 5th century, the Western Church under Pope Innocent I recognized a biblical canon including the four gospels of Matthew, Mark, Luke, and John, which was previously established at a number of regional Synods, namely the Council of Rome (382), the Synod of Hippo (393), and two Councils of Carthage (397 and 419).

Eastern canons

The Eastern Churches had, in general, a weaker feeling than those in the West for the necessity of making a sharp delineation with regard to the canon. They were more conscious of the gradation of spiritual quality among the books that they accepted (e.g. the classification of Eusebius, see also Antilegomena) and were less often disposed to assert that the books which they rejected possessed no spiritual quality at all. Similarly, the New Testament canons of the Syriac, Armenian, Georgian, Egyptian Coptic and Ethiopian Churches all have minor differences.

Outside the Empire

Syriac Canon

In the 4th century, the Doctrine of Addai lists a 17-book NT canon using the Diatessaron and Acts and 15 Pauline epistles (including 3rd Corinthians). The Syriac Doctrine of Addai (c. 400) claims to record the oldest traditions of the Syriac Christianity, and among these is the establishment of a canon: members of the church are to read only the Gospel (meaning the Diatessaron of Tatian), the Epistles of Paul (which are said to have been sent by Peter, from Rome), and the Book of Acts (which is said to have been sent by John the son of Zebedee, from Ephesus), and nothing else.

By the 5th century, the Syriac Bible, called the Peshitta, was formalized, accepting Philemon, along with James, 1 Peter and 1 John, but excluding 2 John, 3 John, 2 Peter, Jude and Revelation. After the Council of Ephesus, the Church of the East became separated, and retained this canon of only 22-books (the Peshitta) up to the present day. The Syriac Orthodox Church uses this text as well (known in the West Syriac dialect  as the Peshitto), but with the addition of the other books normally present in the New Testament canon.

The late-5th or early-6th century Peshitta of the Syriac Orthodox Church includes a 22-book NT, excluding II Peter, II John, III John, Jude, and Revelation.  The Lee Peshitta of 1823 follows the Protestant canon.

, lists the following Syrian catalogue of St. Catherine's, c. 400:

The Syriac Peshitta, used by all the various Syriac Churches, originally did not include 2 Peter, 2 John, 3 John, Jude and Revelation (and this canon of 22 books is the one cited by John Chrysostom (~347–407) and Theodoret (393–466) from the School of Antioch). It also includes Psalm 151 and Psalm 152–155 and 2 Baruch. Western Syrians have added the remaining 5 books to their NT canons in modern times (such as the Lee Peshitta of 1823). Today, the official lectionaries followed by the Malankara Syrian Orthodox Church, with headquarters at Kottayam (India), and the Chaldean Syrian Church, also known as the Church of the East (Nestorian), with headquarters at Trichur (India), still present lessons from only the 22-books of the original Peshitta.

Armenian canon
The Armenian Bible introduces one addition: a third letter to the Corinthians, also found in the Acts of Paul, which became canonized in the Armenian Church, but is not part of the Armenian Bible today. The Book of Revelation was not accepted into the Armenian Bible until c. 1200 AD when Archbishop Nerses arranged an Armenian Synod at Constantinople to introduce the text. Still, there were unsuccessful attempts even as late as 1290 AD to include in the Armenian canon several apocryphal books: Advice of the Mother of God to the Apostles, the Books of Criapos, and the ever-popular Epistle of Barnabas.

The Armenian Apostolic church at times has included the Testaments of the Twelve Patriarchs in its Old Testament and the Third Epistle to the Corinthians, but does not always list them with the other 27 canonical New Testament books.

Coptic and Ethiopian canons
The New Testament of the Coptic Bible, adopted by the Egyptian Church, includes the two Epistles of Clement. The canon of the Tewahedo Churches is somewhat looser than for other traditional Christian groups, and the order, naming, and chapter/verse division of some of the books is also slightly different.

The Ethiopian "narrow" canon includes 81 books altogether: The 27 book New Testament; those Old Testament books found in the Septuagint and accepted by the Orthodox; as well as Enoch, Jubilees, 2 Esdras, Rest of the Words of Baruch and 3 books of Meqabyan (these three Ethiopian books of Maccabees are entirely different in content from the four Books of Maccabees known elsewhere).

The "broader" Ethiopian New Testament canon includes four books of "Sinodos" (church practices), two "Books of Covenant", "Ethiopic Clement", and "Ethiopic Didascalia" (Apostolic Church-Ordinances). However, these books have never been printed or widely studied. This "broader" canon is also sometimes said to include, with the Old Testament, an eight-part history of the Jews based on the writings of Flavius Josephus, and known as "Pseudo-Josephus" or "Joseph ben Gurion" (Yosēf walda Koryon).

Protestant developments (from c. 1517)

The Encyclopedia of Theology says that the 27 books which make up the New Testament canon of Scripture are not based on a Scriptural list that authenticates them to be inspired, thus their legitimacy is considered impossible to be distinguished with certainty without appealing to another infallible source, such as the Magisterium of the Catholic Church which first assembled and authenticated this list at the Council of Rome. Catholicism considers the Magisterium, i.e. the teaching authority, has equal position and linked together with Sacred Tradition and Sacred Scripture, each acts in its own way for the goodness of the Church. Rejecting these, Protestant reformers focused on the doctrine of sola scriptura, i.e. the supreme authority of Scripture alone. Sola scriptura is one of the five solas, considered by some Protestant groups to be the theological pillars of the Protestant Reformation.

Martin Luther

Martin Luther was troubled by four books, referred to as Luther's Antilegomena: Jude, James, Hebrews, and Revelation; while he placed them in a secondary position relative to the rest, he did not exclude them.  He did propose removing them from the canon, echoing the consensus of several Catholics such as Cardinal Cajetan and Erasmus, and partially because they were perceived to go against certain Protestant doctrines such as sola gratia and sola fide, but this was not generally accepted among his followers. However, these books are ordered last in the German-language Luther Bible to this day.

Catholic developments (from c. 1546)

Council of Trent

The Council of Trent on April 8, 1546, approved the enforcement of the present Roman Catholic Bible Canon including the Deuterocanonical Books as an article of faith, and the decision was confirmed by an anathema by vote (24 yea, 15 nay, 16 abstain). This is said to be the same list as produced at the Council of Florence (Session 11, 4 February 1442), Augustine's 397-419 Councils of Carthage, and probably Damasus' 382 Council of Rome. Because of its placement, the list was not considered binding for the Catholic Church, and in light of Martin Luther's demands, the Catholic Church examined the question of the Canon again at the Council of Trent, which reaffirmed the canon of previous councils and added the anathema against attempts to change the contents of the canon.

Later developments
The First Vatican Council on April 24, 1870, approved the additions to Mark (v. 16:9–20), Luke (22:19b–20, 43–44), and John (7:53–8:11), which are not present in early manuscripts but are contained in the Vulgate edition.

Pope Pius XI on June 2, 1927, decreed the Comma Johanneum was open to investigative scrutiny.

Pope Pius XII on 3 September 1943 issued the encyclical Divino afflante Spiritu, which allowed translations based on texts other than the Latin Vulgate.

Orthodox developments (from c. 1672)

Synod of Jerusalem

The Synod of Jerusalem in 1672 decreed the Greek Orthodox Canon which is similar to the one decided by the Council of Trent. They "call[ed] Sacred Scripture all those [books] which Cyril collected from the Synod of Laodicea, and enumerated, adding to Scripture those which he foolishly and ignorantly, or rather maliciously, called Apocrypha; specifically, [List of deuterocanonical books...]."

But it is to be noted that this was simply an affirmation of tradition, not a new canonization. As the Confession goes on to state, "ancient custom, or rather the Catholic Church, which has delivered to us as genuine the Sacred Gospels and the other Books of Scripture, has undoubtedly delivered these [deuterocanonical books] also as parts of Scripture.... And if, perhaps, it seems that not always have all of these been considered on the same level as the others, yet nevertheless these also have been counted and reckoned with the rest of Scripture, both by Synods and by many of the most ancient and eminent Theologians of the Catholic Church. All of these we also judge to be Canonical Books, and confess them to be Sacred Scripture..."

See also
 Apostolic Fathers
 Biblical apocrypha
 Biblical canon
 List of early Christian writers
 List of Gospels

Notes

References

Bibliography

Primary sources
 
 .

Secondary sources
 .
 .
 .
 Bourgel, Jonathan, "Do the Synoptic Narratives of the Passion Contain a Stratum Composed in Judea on the Eve of the Great Revolt?", NTS 58 (2012), 503–21, (French).
 .
 .
 
 .
 .
 .
 .
 .
 .
 .
 .
 .

External links
  – includes very detailed charts and direct links to ancient witnesses.
 YouTube: Introduction to New Testament – From Stories to Canon · the second lecture from an open online Yale University course taught by Dale Martin

 
Early Christianity
New Testament
Marcionism

de:Kanon des Neuen Testaments
es:Evangelios canónicos